The Society of Anubis was a semi-secret homophile society in the United States. It was relatively large for its time, with approximately 800 members in the mid-1960s and approximately 1,000 members in 1970. It had both male and female members. It was founded in 1967 and received a state charter in 1969.

The society was conservative in character, and focused on social and community programs. They maintained a ten-acre ranch in the San Gabriel Valley in California, as well as a club.

The society participated in the first pride parade, which was held in New York City in 1970. Their float was a representation of the ancient Egyptian god Anubis riding on a white horse.

In 1969, when two undercover agents infiltrated the society and staged a raid by the Vice Squad at a member's birthday party, Helen Niehaus used her body to block officers' cameras, and was threatened with arrest. In 1970, she was the president of the Society of Anubis.

Notable events 

 On the evening of January 11, 1970, members of the Society of Anubis took part in a demonstration in Los Angeles for gay rights. The stated purpose of the march was "to protest the laws against homosexual acts by adults and to urge the California Supreme Court to grant hearings on the constitutionality of the laws which make said acts a felony." A crowd of about 300 people marched along Hollywood Boulevard carrying signs, flags, and banners.
 On April 5, 1970, Helen Niehaus performed "outlaw marriages" of homosexual couples at a "Gay-In" protest event in Los Angeles.

See also 
 Order of Chaeronea
 Mattachine Society

References

Bibliography 

 

LGBT history in the United States
LGBT organizations in the United States
1967 establishments in the United States
1967 in LGBT history